The Jungle Book, the soundtrack to the eponymous Disney film, has been released in three different versions since the film's original release in 1967. The film score was composed by George Bruns, with songs written by Terry Gilkyson and the Sherman Brothers.

Composition
The instrumental music was written by George Bruns and orchestrated by Walter Sheets. Two of the cues were reused from previous Disney films, with the scene where Mowgli wakes up after escaping King Louie using one of Bruns' themes for Sleeping Beauty, and Bagheera giving a eulogy to Baloo when he mistakenly thinks the bear was killed by Shere Khan being accompanied by Paul J. Smith's organ score from Snow White and the Seven Dwarfs.

"Overture" and "Jungle Beat" are scores separated from one deleted score "The Sand of Time" from The Sword in the Stone.

Longtime Disney collaborator Terry Gilkyson was brought in to write the songs for the film. Gilkyson delivered several complete songs which were faithful in tone to Rudyard Kipling's novel, but Walt Disney felt that his efforts were too dark. The Sherman Brothers were brought in to do a complete rewrite, on the condition that they not read Kipling's book. The only piece of Gilkyson's work which survived to the final film was his upbeat tune "The Bare Necessities", which was liked by the rest of the film crew. In one of his first union jobs, famed songwriter Van Dyke Parks arranged the version of "Necessities" heard in the film.

Walt Disney asked the Shermans to "find scary places and write fun songs" for their compositions, and frequently brought them to storyline sessions. The duo decided to do songs that fit in the story and advanced the plot instead of being interruptive. The song "Trust in Me" is based upon a song entitled "Land of Sand" which had been written by the Sherman Brothers for, but not used in, Mary Poppins.

"We're Your Friends" was originally conceived as a rock and roll song, sung by the quartet of vultures. The vultures were even designed based on The Beatles, with moptop haircuts and Liverpudlian accents, and would be voiced by the band, which did not come into fruition due to problems with their schedule. During production Disney decided the 60's style rock would cause the song to be considered dated later, leading "We're Your Friends" to be changed to the barbershop quartet that appears in the film. One of The Mellomen's members, Bill Lee, sang as Shere Khan during the final recording of the song because George Sanders was unavailable, and can be heard on the soundtrack.

Versions

Storyteller
The first version was Walt Disney Presents the Story and Songs of The Jungle Book, also known as the "Storyteller" version, issued on the Disneyland Records label. It featured a retelling of the story with narration by voice actor Dal McKennon as Bagheera, and dialogue and sound effects from the film itself along with the songs. It was a commercial success, being certified Gold by the RIAA, and was later nominated for a Grammy Award for Best Album for Children. Another version, simply titled The Jungle Book, was issued on the Buena Vista Records label, featuring less narration and dialogue to be marketed for adults. It was first reissued on CD in 1990, as Disneyland Records was reworked into Walt Disney Records.

Track listing

Songs from The Jungle Book and Other Jungle Favorites
Disneyland Records issued another soundtrack album in 1967, Songs from Walt Disney's The Jungle Book and other Jungle Favorites, which featured reworked jazz versions of the film's songs plus two covers, performed by Louis Prima and his band under the title "The Jungle V.I.P.s".

Tracks

1997 reissue
Disney Records reissued the soundtrack in 1997, coinciding with the reissue of the film on VHS to celebrate its 30th anniversary. The soundtrack marked the first time a majority of George Bruns' instrumental score was included. This version included an interview with the Sherman Brothers, and four bonus songs: two demos of the discarded Terry Gilkyson songs, and two songs taken from the 1968 Disneyland Records album More Jungle Book, an unofficial sequel to the film written by screenwriter Larry Simmons.

Track listing

Certifications and sales

Megamix single
In 1993, a medley of "I Wan'na Be like You" and "The Bare Necessities" called "The Jungle Book Groove" was released by Disney's Hollywood record label. Credited by the Official Charts Company as being by the artist Jungle Book, the record charted at number 14 on the UK singles chart and spent 8 weeks in the UK Top 75.

References

Bibliography

External links
The Jungle Book soundtrack at Disney.com

Soundtrack
Disney animation soundtracks
1967 soundtrack albums
Walt Disney Records soundtracks